Orlando Metcalfe Poe (March 7, 1832 – October 2, 1895) was a United States Army officer and engineer in the American Civil War. After helping General William Tecumseh Sherman's March to the Sea, he was responsible for much of the early lighthouse construction on the Great Lakes and design of the Poe Lock at Soo Locks between lakes Superior and Huron.

Early life
Orlando Metcalfe Poe was born in the midwestern city of Navarre, Ohio located in the Tuscarawas River valley. His parents were Charles Poe and Susannah Warner and he was the first of their five children. After going to local schools, he attended the United States Military Academy, graduating sixth in his class in 1856. From then until 1861 he served as an assistant topographical engineer on the survey of the northern Great Lakes; during this time he was promoted to first lieutenant.

Notable ancestors
Poe's great-great-grandparents were Catherine and George Jacob Pfau.  They were of Palatine German descent, and their sons were the first to Anglicize their surname to Poe following the American Revolutionary War. The Pfau family migrated to Ohio from central western Maryland near modern day Camp David, where George and Catherine Pfau originally settled. Pfau's sons Adam and Andrew were noted for their skirmishes with Native Americans in southern Beaver County, Ohio. Both men were known as fearless fighters. The first Andrew Poe is reputed to have slain the Wyandot Indian Chief Bigfoot in 1781.  The brothers’ exploits were detailed in volume II of Theodore Roosevelt’s book, The Winning of the West from the Alleghenies to the Mississippi, 1777 - 1783. 

Poe was a second cousin of the painter Andrew Jackson Poe. He also had English heritage from Metcalfe ancestors.

Civil War service
At the start of the American Civil War, Poe assisted in organizing the volunteers from Ohio; later, he was made a member of Maj. Gen. George B. McClellan's staff in western Virginia and took part in the Rich Mountain campaign. He went with McClellan to Washington and assisted by organizing the defense of the capital. Promoted to colonel of volunteers that September, he was placed in command of the 2nd Michigan Volunteer Infantry Regiment. He commanded them successfully from Yorktown through the Battle of Seven Pines during the Peninsula Campaign; he next was given field command of a brigade prior to the Northern Virginia Campaign of 1862. His brigade anchored the far right of the Union line at the August 29–30 battle of Second Bull Run but was only lightly engaged. Several days later on September 1, Poe and his men participated in the Battle of Chantilly. His brigade was present, but not active during the December 1862 Battle of Fredericksburg.

Poe was appointed brigadier general of volunteers effective November 29, 1862; however, the appointment was rejected by Congress in the spring of 1863. Poe reverted to his old rank of lieutenant in the regular army but was soon promoted to captain and then transferred to the Western Theater. In his capacity as chief engineer of the XXIII Corps, he was a key factor in the defense of Knoxville, Tennessee. This city was successfully defended against a siege led by Confederate Lt. Gen. James Longstreet, which culminated in the November 29, 1863, Battle of Fort Sanders. Due to Poe's contributions, Maj. Gen. William T. Sherman selected Poe as his chief engineer in 1864.

Sherman's chief engineer
As chief engineer, Poe oversaw the burning of Atlanta, for which action he was honored by Sherman. Poe directly supervised the dismantling of all buildings and structures in Atlanta that could have provided any military value to the Rebels once Sherman abandoned the city; rail depots, roundhouses, arsenals and storage areas were manually disassembled and the combustible materials then destroyed by controlled fires (however, Poe was incensed at the level of uncontrolled unsanctioned arson by marauding soldiers not of his unit which resulted in heavy damage to civilian homes.)  

Poe continued to serve as chief engineer during Sherman's March to the Sea. Poe was indispensable  (by the commanding General's own words) during the March, when Sherman cut loose from his supply lines  headed southeast across the body of Georgia to Savannah, living off the land, to bring fire and pillage to the center of the Confederacy.  Dozens of river crossings, poor or non-existent roads and the extensive swamps of southern Georgia would have fatally slowed Sherman's force had not Poe's skills as leader of the bridge, road and pontoon building units kept the army moving. He also continued to supervise destruction of Confederate infrastructure. 

Breveted to colonel after the fall of Savannah, Poe continued as Sherman's chief engineer in the war's concluding Carolinas Campaign as Sherman headed northwards from Savannah to link up with Grant and the Army of the Potomac in Virginia and to cut another swath through South and North Carolina. When the war ended Poe was breveted to Brigadier General in the regular army.

Postbellum career

In Summer 1865 Poe became the Lighthouse Board's chief engineer; in 1870 he was promoted to the position of Chief Engineer of the Upper Great Lakes 11th Lighthouse District. In this capacity, he designed eight "Poe style lighthouses" and oversaw construction of several.  Poe was named District Engineer for the Eleventh Lighthouse District, Those lights are New Presque Isle Light (1870) on Lake Huron, Lake Michigan's South Manitou Island Light (1872), Grosse Point Light (1873) in Evanston, Illinois, Lake Superior's Au Sable Light (1874), Racine, Wisconsin's Wind Point Light (1880); Outer Island Light (1874) in the Apostle Islands, Little Sable Point Light (1874) on Lake Michigan, Manistique, Michigan's Seul Choix Light (1895) and Spectacle Reef Light.

As Superintending Engineer, he designed a unique lighthouse — in terms of location, construction materials, methods, hardships and costs — at the Spectacle Reef Light on Lake Huron.  That light has been described as "the best specimen of monolithic stone masonry in the United States", and "one of the greatest engineering feats on the Great Lakes." Poe solved the logistics problem of building a lighthouse on the remote Stannard Rock in Lake Superior with the proposal to use all the costly apparatus and machinery used to build the Spectacle Reef Light. The exposed crib of the Stannard Rock Light is rated in the top ten engineering feats in the United States.  Many of these lights were of Italianate architecture, a chief example being that of the Grosse Point Light.

From 1873 through 1883 Poe served as engineering Aide-de-camp on the staff of William T. Sherman, who was then commanding general of the U.S. Army. In 1883 he was made Superintending Engineer of improvement of rivers and harbors on Lakes Superior and Huron, where he helped to develop the St. Marys Falls Canal.  Many consider his crowning achievement to be the design and implementation of the first Poe Lock in the American Soo Locks in Sault Ste. Marie, as it was instrumental in making possible the shipping industry, including steel craft freighters, in the upper Great Lakes. Consequently, it was pivotal to the creation of the basic steel industry in the United States. Poe's creation was dismantled in the early 1960s with a larger, more modern lock being built on the same site. This new passageway was renamed the Poe Lock and serves the largest of the Great Lakes freighters to this day.

Death and legacy
Poe died in Detroit on October 2, 1895, of an infection following an on-duty accident at the "Soo Locks," and was buried at Arlington National Cemetery. Poe Reef and the Poe Reef Light in Lake Huron bear his name.

See also

History of the modern steel industry
List of American Civil War generals (Union)

References
Notes

Bibliography
 Roosevelt, Theodore. The Winning of the West from the Alleghenies to the Mississippi, 1777 - 1783, volume II, 6. ISO-8859-1.
 Taylor, Paul, "Orlando M. Poe: Sherman's Right Hand Man" in North & South, vol. 10, no. 6 (June 2008).
 Trudeau, Noah Andre. "Southern Storm: Sherman's March to the Sea" Harper Collins, (2008).

Further reading
Evans, David, Sherman's Horsemen: Union Cavalry Operations in the Atlanta Campaign (Indiana University Press, 1996). ; .
.
 Putnam, George R. Lighthouses and Lightships of the United States, (Boston: Houghton Mifflin Co., 1933), pp. 44, 156.
Staff (October 3, 1895) Obituary of Orlando M. Poe  The New York Times
Taylor, Paul. Orlando M. Poe: Civil War General and Great Lakes Engineer. Kent, Ohio: Kent State Univ. Press, 2009. .

External links

Bush, Bryan S. (Civil War historian/author), "Brevet Brig. General Orlando Metcalfe Poe".

Lighthouse Digest The Lighthouse Man Who Was Ordered to Burn Atlanta, November, 2005.
Map Illustrating the Siege of Atlanta, 1864 by General Orlando M. Poe, David Rumsey Map collection.
National Park Service Maritime Heritage Project, Architects, Engineers and Contractors.
Terry Pepper, Seeing the Light, Orlando Metcalfe Poe: The Great Engineer of the Western Great Lakes biography.
Rabineau, Roland, Let's Talk Lighthouses, Poe biography.
U.S. Corps of Topographical Engineers, Orlando M. Poe.
Wobser, David, Boatnerd.com, Orlando Poe.
Orlando M. Poe Collection, 1836-ca. 1890, University of Louisville Libraries
Lot 189 : Property originally from the collection of Captain Orlando Metcalfe Roe, Sotheby's catalog #136, Orland Poe's "Carte de Visite".  General Poe's personal "Carte de visite" album with many Civil War pictures and memorabilia sold at auction in 2005.

1832 births
1895 deaths
Burials at Arlington National Cemetery
Lighthouse builders
People from Navarre, Ohio
People of Ohio in the American Civil War
Union Army generals
United States Military Academy alumni
Engineers from Ohio